Mother's Boy is a 1929 American black-and-white musical drama film directed by Bradley Barker and starring Morton Downey and Beryl Mercer.

Plot

Cast
Morton Downey as Tommy O'Day
Beryl Mercer as Mrs. O'Day
John T. Doyle as Mr. O'Day
Brian Donlevy as Harry O'Day
Helen Chandler as Rose Lyndon
Osgood Perkins as Jake Sturmberg
Lorin Raker as Joe Bush
Barbara Bennett as Beatrix Townleigh
Jennie Moskowitz as Mrs. Apfelbaum
Jacob Frank as Mr. Apfelbaum
Louis Sorin as Mr. Bumble
Robert Gleckler as Gus LeGrand
Tyrell Davis as Duke of Pomplum
Allen Vincent as Dinslow
Leslie Stowe as Evangelist

Soundtrack
 "There'll Be You and I"
(uncredited)
Music Sam H. Stept
Lyrics by Bud Green
Copyright 1929 Green & Stept Inc.
 "Come to Me"
(uncredited)
Music Sam H. Stept
Lyrics by Bud Green
 "I'll Always Be Mother's Boy"
(uncredited)
Music Sam H. Stept
Lyrics by Bud Green
 "The World Is Yours and Mine"
(uncredited)
Music Sam H. Stept
Lyrics by Bud Green

External links

1929 films
American black-and-white films
1920s musical drama films
Pathé Exchange films
American musical drama films
1929 drama films
1920s English-language films
1920s American films